The 2020–21 Fulham F.C. season was the club's 123rd season in existence and the first season back in the top flight of English football. In addition to the domestic league, Fulham participated in this season's editions of the FA Cup and the EFL Cup.

Players

Current squad

Transfers

Transfers in

Loans in

Loans out

Transfers out

Pre-season and friendlies

Competitions

Overview

Premier League

League table

Results summary

Results by round

Matches
The 2020–21 season fixtures were released on 20 August.

FA Cup

The third round draw was made on 30 November, with Premier League and EFL Championship clubs all entering the competition. The draw for the fourth and fifth round were made on 11 January, conducted by Peter Crouch.

EFL Cup

The draw for both the second and third round were confirmed on September 6, live on Sky Sports by Phil Babb. The fourth round draw was conducted on 17 September 2020 by Laura Woods and Lee Hendrie live on Sky Sports.

Squad statistics

Appearances and goals

|-
! colspan=14 style=background:#dcdcdc; text-align:center| Goalkeepers

|-
! colspan=14 style=background:#dcdcdc; text-align:center| Defenders

|-
! colspan=14 style=background:#dcdcdc; text-align:center| Midfielders

|-
! colspan=14 style=background:#dcdcdc; text-align:center| Forwards

|-
! colspan=14 style=background:#dcdcdc; text-align:center|Out on Loan

|-

Top scorers
Includes all competitive matches. The list is sorted by squad number when total goals are equal.

Last updated 23 May 2021.

Notes

References

External links

Fulham F.C. seasons
Fulham
Fulham
Fulham